The 2018 Toulon Tournament was an international association football tournament held in Bouches-du-Rhône, France. The twelve national teams involved in the tournament were required to register a squad of 20 players; only players in these squads were eligible to take part in the tournament.

Group A

China PR
Head coach:  Sun Jihai

England
Head coach:  Aidy Boothroyd

Mexico
Head coach:  Marco Antonio Ruiz

Qatar
Head coach:  Bruno Pinheiro

Group B

France
Head coach:  Johan Radet

Scotland
Head coach:  Scot Gemmill

South Korea
Head coach:  Chung Jung-yong

Togo
Head coach:  Claude Le Roy

Group C

Canada
Co-Coaches:  John Herdman and  Mauro Biello

Japan
Head coach:  Akinobu Yokouchi

Portugal
Head coach:  Hélio Sousa

Turkey
Head coach:  Muzaffer Bilazer

References

Toulon Tournament squads
2018 Toulon Tournament